Route 205, also known as Hatchet Cove Road, is a relatively short east-west highway on the island of Newfoundland in the Canadian province of Newfoundland and Labrador. It connects the communities along the northern shore of the Southwest Arm of Trinity Bay with Route 1.    It is the last provincial route heading west along the Trans-Canada Highway (Route 1) before approaching the Town of Clarenville.

Route description

Route 205 begins in Hillview at an intersection with Route 1 (TCH). It winds its way eastward through the community before leaving Hillview and passing through rural wooded terrain for several kilometres. The highway now passes through Hatchet Cove before heading through hilly areas to enter St. Jones Within, where it comes to a dead end after passing through town along Northside Road.

Major intersections

References

205